José Luis Cabrera Cava (born 10 May 1982) is a Spanish retired footballer who played as a defensive midfielder.

Club career
Cabrera was born in Madrid. An unsuccessful Real Madrid youth graduate, he made his professional debut with Pontevedra CF, playing with the Galicians one season in the second division and two in the third.

In 2006–07, Cabrera was an important defensive weapon as UD Almería achieved a first–ever La Liga promotion. However, he was deemed surplus to requirements by coach Unai Emery, moving in January 2008 to Deportivo Alavés – now in the second level – where he suffered a terrible knee injury in his first game which made him lose the remainder of the campaign.

Following Alavés' 2009 relegation, Cabrera signed with Córdoba CF in the summer, also in division two. In early January 2010, during the first half of the 0–0 home draw against FC Cartagena, he suffered the same injury, being lost for the rest of 2009–10.

Cabrera returned to the third tier in January 2012, with the 29-year-old signing with CF Villanovense.

References

External links

1982 births
Living people
Footballers from Madrid
Spanish footballers
Association football midfielders
La Liga players
Segunda División players
Segunda División B players
Tercera División players
Real Madrid C footballers
Real Madrid Castilla footballers
Pontevedra CF footballers
UD Almería players
Deportivo Alavés players
Córdoba CF players
CF Villanovense players